Henry Neale may refer to:

John Henry Neale II (1896-1961), prominent American shipping executive
J. Henry Neale (1905-1989), United States lawyer and banker

See also
Henry S. Neal (1828–1906), American lawyer and politician
Henry Neele (1798–1828), English poet and literary scholar